Princess Beatrice (born 1988) is the daughter of Prince Andrew, Duke of York, and granddaughter of Queen Elizabeth II.

Princess Beatrice may also refer to:

People
Beatrice of England (1242–1275), daughter of Henry III of England and Eleanor of Provence, married John II of Brittany
Princess Beatrice of the United Kingdom (1857–1944), youngest child of Queen Victoria and Prince Albert of Saxe-Coburg and Gotha
Beatrice Bhadrayuvadi (1876–1913), daughter of King Chulalongkorn of Siam
Princess Beatrice of Saxe-Coburg and Gotha (1884–1966), youngest daughter of Alfred I, Duke of Saxe-Coburg and Gotha and Grand Duchess Maria Alexandrovna of Russia
Infanta Beatriz of Spain (1909–2002), third child and elder daughter of King Alfonso XIII of Spain and Princess Victoria Eugenie of Battenberg
Beatrix of the Netherlands (born 1938), former Queen of the Netherlands
Princess Béatrice of Bourbon-Two Sicilies (born 1950), eldest child of Prince Ferdinand, Duke of Castro and Chantal de Chevron-Villette

Other uses
Princess Beatrice, a GWR 3031 Class locomotive built for the Great Western Railway
SS Princess Beatrice, a steamship that operated on the coast of British Columbia